David Langer may refer to:

 David Langer (neurosurgeon), neurosurgeon at Lenox Hill Hospital
 David Langer (footballer) (born 1976), Czech footballer